Mr. Bug Goes to Town (also known as Hoppity Goes to Town and Bugville) is a 1941 American animated Technicolor feature film produced by Fleischer Studios, previewed by Paramount Pictures on December 5, 1941, and released in California and New York City in February 1942.
The film was originally intended to be an adaptation of Maurice Maeterlinck's The Life of the Bee, but the rights could not be attained, or more rightly, Paramount was unwilling to purchase them from Samuel Goldwyn. Instead, they fashioned and crafted an original modern story loosely inspired on the book.

The film was produced by Max Fleischer and directed by Dave Fleischer. It features the songs "We're the Couple in the Castle", "Katy Did, Katy Didn't", "I'll Dance at Your Wedding (Honey Dear)" by Hoagy Carmichael and Frank Loesser, and "Boy Oh Boy" by Sammy Timberg and Loesser. It was Paramount's last animated feature film until Charlotte's Web in 1973.

Plot

Hoppity the Grasshopper, after a period spent away, returns to an American city (Manhattan, New York City). He finds that all is not as he left it, and his insect friends, who live in the "Lowlands" just outside the garden of a cute bungalow belonging to down-on-his-luck songwriter Dick Dickens and his wife Mary, are now under threat from the "human ones", who are trampling through the broken-down fence, using it as a shortcut.

Insect houses are being flattened and burned by cast away cigar butts. Old Mr. Bumble and his beautiful daughter Honey (Hoppity's sweetheart) are in grave danger of losing their Honey Shop to this threat. To compound their problems, devious insect "property magnate" C. Bagley Beetle has romantic designs on Honey Bee himself, and, with the help of his henchmen Swat the Fly and Smack the Mosquito, hatches plans to make Honey marry him or eliminate Hoppity as a romantic rival.

Hoppity discovers that the songwriter and his wife are waiting for a "check thing" from the Famous Music publishing company for the songwriter's composition, "We're the Couple in the Castle." With this money they can repair the fence, saving the bug community. But C. Bagley Beetle and his henchmen intercept and hide the check, and the Dickens house is foreclosed. Days pass, and with nothing improved, nearly everyone in the lowlands loses faith in Hoppity's claim. Mr. Beetle discovers that a skyscraper will be built on the site, destroying both the Lowlands and his own property. He schemes to "gift" the other bugs his soon-to-be worthless property on the condition that Honey marry him. When he realizes that Hoppity was nearby and overheard him, he seals Hoppity inside the envelope with the Dickenses' check, hiding it in a crack in a wall.

Construction begins while everyone is at the wedding of Beetle and Honey; a weight from a surveyor's level that rips through the chapel causes the terrified bugs to flee back to the Lowlands, not realizing their own homes are endangered by the construction crew. Hoppity escapes when the construction crew demolishes the wall, freeing the envelope. Hoppity comes to Honey's rescue, battles Beetle and his henchmen, and wins.

Hoppity tells everyone what happened and manages to get the check to Mr. Dickens. "We're the Couple in the Castle" becomes a massive hit. Meanwhile, Hoppity leads an exodus from the Lowlands to the top of the skyscraper, where he believes the Dickenses have built a new home and invited the bugs to live there. They get to the top, which at first appears to be barren, but the young bugs discover the Dickenses have built a new penthouse with a "Garden of Paradise" just as Hoppity had described. Honey and the rest of the Lowlanders live there happily ever after in their new home. And as Ambrose looks over the edge, he remarks, "Look at all the human ones down there. They look just like a lot of little bugs!"

Production
Fleischer Studios' first feature, Gulliver's Travels, did such impressive business in its first week that Paramount president Barney Balaban ordered another feature for a Christmas 1941 release.

Mr. Bug Goes to Town is similar in concept to Gulliver’s Travels with its large cast of characters, complicated crowd scenes, and the contrasting scale of tiny characters against the gigantic human world. In Mr. Bug, the environment is central to the picture. While the lead characters, Hoppity the grasshopper and Honey Bee, do not lead the story as clearly as Disney characters do, it is the situation that propels the plot combined with colorful supporting comical characters.
 
Mr. Bug Goes to Town was beset by problems due to the rift between Max and Dave Fleischer that began during the production of Gulliver's Travels.  From that point on, they communicated with each other via internal memos while working in the same building. Running a major animated cartoon studio solely by written communique turned out to be "a sort of tragicomedy."

Paramount was acutely aware of the problems between the Fleischer brothers and structured their contract for the completion of Mr. Bug in an unusual way, allowing for the resignation of either brother following its completion. When Paramount renewed the Fleischer contract on May 24, 1941, a clause stipulated that the brothers deliver signed letters of resignation to Paramount to be used at the studio's discretion. Post-production concluded in Hollywood just before Thanksgiving, and Dave tendered his resignation one month before the scheduled release.

Mr. Bug Goes to Town was the first animated feature to give screen credit to the voice actors. The voices were provided by actor Stan Freed (Hoppity) and Pauline Loth (Honey). The supporting characters were voiced by members of the studio staff including Jack Mercer, the voice of Popeye (Mr. Bumble, Swat the Fly, Insects), and storymen Tedd Pierce (C. Bagley Beetle, Insects), Carl Meyer (Smack the Mosquito), Pinto Colvig (Mr. Creeper, Insects), Gwen Davis and Jean Rhys (Mrs. Ladybug), Mae Questel (Buzz the Beescout, Insects) and Margie Hines (Insects). Singer Kenny Gardner and actress Gwen Williams portrayed "The Human Ones," Songwriter Dick Dickens and his wife, Mary.

Book and other merchandise

The film received a book adaptation which was released around the same time - it features new characters along with the ones from the film and goes further on key plots. For example, in the film Honey is aware of Beetle's romantic interest, expressing dislike to him but willing to make the sacrifice if it means everyone can live safely on his property away from the broken fence. However, in the book, Hoppity is made aware of this fact by Ambrose the Bee Scout, making Beetle's conflict with Hoppity more apparent from the start. Whether this was part of the film's script is unknown.  The film also inspired a Mr. Bug Goes to Town board game and a series of trading cards.

Release
Mr. Bug Goes to Town was previewed on December 5, 1941 in advance of its scheduled Christmas release.  While it was well received by critics, theater operators rejected it. Two days later, the Japanese attack on Pearl Harbor signaled America's entrance into World War II, and Paramount canceled the Christmas release. Three weeks later, Paramount president Barney Balaban activated Max Fleischer's resignation. Paramount finally released the film in California on February 13, 1942 (February 20 in New York City). In the UK, it opened during January 1942 under the name Hoppity Goes to Town.

Mr. Bug was a financial disaster. Paramount reorganized Fleischer Studios as Famous Studios. Before the film's release, Walter Lantz, Paul Terry, and Leon Schlesinger all considered producing animated feature films, but after seeing the disappointing box-office of this film and the initial failures of Walt Disney's new films Pinocchio and Fantasia (both 1940), they cancelled any potential animated feature projects.

Harlan Ellison described vivid memories of having to outwit his family in order to see Mr. Bug Goes to Town for free on his birthday in his book Harlan Ellison's Watching. He credits his exploit as having fostered his rebellious nature rather than remaining a sweet obedient child. He never got to see the entire film until it came out on videocassette, and he watched it frequently throughout his adult life.

Paramount later re-released Mr. Bug as Hoppity Goes to Town (the original title is a parody of the title of the 1936 film Mr. Deeds Goes to Town). The film cost $713,511 to make, but by 1946 had only made $241,000 back, and was withdrawn from circulation. Under the reissue title, Hoppity has had multiple re-releases on home video throughout the 1970s (most with inferior image quality) to its DVD release by Legend Films, in which the studio re-titled the film again to Bugville (presumably to position against Pixar's A Bug's Life).

The film was acquired in the 1950s by National Telefilm Associates (which became Republic) and enjoyed a renewed popularity as a staple on local "movie classics" shows such as Family Classics on Chicago's WGN. The film (as Hoppity Goes to Town) was officially released by Republic Pictures on VHS and LaserDisc in May 1989. 

In Japan, the movie was released on December 19, 2009 as part of Studio Ghibli's Ghibli Museum Library. A DVD was released in April 2010 by Walt Disney Studios Home Entertainment in Japan, and it has been reported to be a restoration using NTA re-release elements. Recently, Mr. Bug, along with many other Fleischer-produced cartoons (including the Fleischers' previous film, Gulliver's Travels), was restored from the original three-strip negatives by the UCLA Film and Television Archive, and a few art-house theaters have recently screened the restoration (which features the original titles).

On October 21, 2012, the Turner Classic Movies channel debuted the film, transferred from an original 35mm Technicolor release print owned by the Museum of Modern Art Department of Film, for the first time on television in a special hosted by Robert Osborne and Jerry Beck dedicated to rare animated films, including Gulliver's Travels, Lotte Reiniger's The Adventures of Prince Achmed, the UPA cartoons and the silent cartoons of 1907 to 1932 of the New York Studios. and again on the channel in June 2015.

See also 

 List of American films of 1941
 Fleischer Studios
 Gulliver's Travels (1939 film)

References

External links

 
 
 Mr. Bug Goes to Town (1941), Studio release DVD, 2019: AllMovies.com website. Retrieved on June 30, 2021.
Mr. Bug Goes to Town at The Big Cartoon DataBase
 
Mr. Bug Goes to Town (aka Hoppity Goes to Town, aka Bugville'' at Don Markstein's Toonopedia. Archived from the original on February 5, 2016.

1941 animated films
1940s musical films
American musical films
Paramount Pictures films
Paramount Pictures animated films
1940s children's fantasy films
Fleischer Studios films
Animated films about insects
Fictional grasshoppers
Films directed by Dave Fleischer
Rotoscoped films
1940s American animated films
Films scored by Leigh Harline
1941 films
1940s children's animated films
Films set in New York City